Rayong Hospital is the main hospital of Rayong Province, Thailand and is classified by the Ministry of Public Health as a regional hospital. It has a CPIRD (Collaborative Project to Increase Production of Rural Doctors) Medical Education Center which trains doctors of the Faculty of Medicine, Burapha University.

History 
In 1946, the construction of a hospital was proposed in Rayong town, due to the difficulty in contacting and accessing healthcare at the closest hospital, which at the time was in Sattahip District, Chonburi Province. It was decided the location should be at the site of Wat Chanthaudom due to its location and construction began on 15 July 1949. The ramshackle temple was dismantled and only a pagoda remains. The hospital was officially opened on 13 April 1951. It became a regional hospital in 1997.

See also 
 Healthcare in Thailand
 Hospitals in Thailand
 List of hospitals in Thailand

References 

Hospitals in Thailand
Buildings and structures in Rayong province